Discovery Channel India is the Indian version of Discovery Channel operated by Warner Bros. Discovery for the Indian subcontinent. It is available in eight languages including Hindi, English, Telugu, Malayalam, Kannada, Bengali and Marathi while the Tamil language has a separate dedicated channel Discovery Tamil. The channel can be viewed on digital cable and satellite television in India. The Discovery Channel has also launched its OTT services Discovery Plus recently.

Original programming 

 A Haunting
 American Digger
 Asian Provocateur
 Bear Grylls Survival School
 Breaking Point: Commando School Belgaum
 Devil's Canyon
 Discovery Hits
 Dual Survival
 Fail Army
 Food Factory
 Hour China
 How Do They Do It?
 How It's Made
 India's Best Jobs
 India's Citizen Squad
 India's Ultimate Warrior
 In Inner Mongolia
 Man vs. Wild
 My 600-lb Life
 Naked and Afraid
 Real Story Of...
 Revealed: Slachen
 Ross Kemp: Extreme World
 Veer by Discovery
 What Went Down
 Wild Frank
 You Have Been Warned

Channels

See also
 Discovery Jeet
 Discovery Kids India
 Discovery Science

References 

India
English-language television stations
English-language television stations in India
Television stations in Mumbai
1995 establishments in Maharashtra